Clip or CLIP may refer to:

Fasteners
 Hair clip, a device for holding hair together or attaching materials such as caps to the hair
 Binder clip, a device for holding thicker materials (such as large volumes of paper) together
 Bulldog clip, a common binder clip
 Paper clip, a device for holding several sheets of paper together
 Climbing clip, a device used to quickly and reversibly connect elements of climbing equipment
 Crocodile clip, or alligator clip, a temporary electrical connector
 Circlip, a semi-flexible metal ring fastener for holding a pin in place
 Roach clip, a holder for smoking a cannabis cigarette
 Bread clip, a device for closing bags
 Rail clip, a rail fastener
 Money clip, a device for storing cash and credit cards in a very compact fashion

Arts and entertainment
 Clip art, pre-made images used in graphic arts
 Media clip, a short segment of electronic media, either an audio clip or a video clip
 Video clip
 Clip (film), a 2012 film
 Clips (game show), a game show that aired on YTV from 1993 to 1996

Science and technology

Biology and medicine
 Class II-associated invariant chain peptide, a protein involved in MHC class II assembly and transport to the cell membrane
 Corticotropin-like intermediate peptide, an endogenous neuropeptide
 Cross-linking immunoprecipitation, a method used in molecular biology to locate RNA modifications among others
 Cancer Likelihood in Plasma

Computing and telecommunications
 Contrastive Language-Image Pre-training, an image recognition artificial intelligence system
 CLIPS, a software tool for building expert systems, including the programming language COOL
 Calling line identification presentation, a Caller ID technology
 Clips (software) a video editing software application created by Apple Inc.

Other uses in science and technology
 Clip (ammunition), a device for storing multiple rounds together as a unit before inserting into a magazine or cylinder
 Caribbean large igneous province, in geology, a major flood basalt
 Confirmed line item performance, a measure of the reliability of supply chain delivery
 Continuous Liquid Interface Production, a form of additive manufacturing that uses photo polymerization

Other uses
 Cupertino Language Immersion Program, a K-8 program in the Cupertino Union School District, California
 Los Angeles Clippers basketball team, nicknamed Clips

See also
 Clipper (disambiguation)
 Clipping (disambiguation)
 Clippy
 Clipse
 Klip (disambiguation)
 Klippe